Salvador Michael Gliatto (May 7, 1902 – November 2, 1995) was a Major League Baseball pitcher who played for one season. He pitched in eight games for the Cleveland Indians during the 1930 Cleveland Indians season.

External links

1902 births
1995 deaths
Major League Baseball pitchers
Cleveland Indians players
Baseball players from Illinois